Frederick Joseph may refer to:

Fred Joseph, former president and chief executive officer of Drexel Burnham Lambert
Frederick Joseph (author), New York Times bestselling author
Frederick Joseph Kinsman, Roman Catholic church historian
Frederick Joseph Miller, American lawyer and politician
Frederick Joseph Ryan, publisher of the Washington Post